Garrison Creek may refer to:
Garrison Creek (Ontario) in Toronto, Canada
Garrison Creek (Missouri)
Garrison Creek (North Dakota)